Agathisanthemum is a genus of flowering plants in the family Rubiaceae. It was described by Johann Friedrich Klotzsch in 1861. It is found in tropical and southern Africa, on the Comoros and in Madagascar.

Species
 Agathisanthemum assimile Bremek. – Tanzania
 Agathisanthemum bojeri Klotzsch – from Somalia to Eswatini plus Madagascar and Comoros
subsp. angolense (Bremek.) Verdc. – Angola, Zambia
subsp. bojeri – most of species range
var. linearifolia Verdc. – Angola, Zambia
 Agathisanthemum chlorophyllum (Hochst.) Bremek. – Natal
 Agathisanthemum globosum (Hochst. ex A.Rich.) Klotzsch – from Gabon and Ethiopia south to Zimbabwe and Mozambique

References

External links 
 World Checklist of Rubiaceae

Rubiaceae genera
Spermacoceae
Flora of Southern Africa